James Good may refer to:

James Isaac Good (1850–1924), American clergyman and historian
James William Good (1866–1929), American politician
James Winder Good (1877–1930), Irish political journalist and writer

See also
James Goode (born 1982), rugby union player
Jamie Goode, British author